Alamata (Tigrinya: ኣላማጣ ) is a town in the Tigray Region of Ethiopia. It is surrounded by Alamata woreda.

History

19th century 
On 14 December 1895, Emperor Menilek's passed through Alamata on their way northwards against the Italians. Arbegnoch under British leadership, liberated the town from Italian control during the Second World War on 5 May 1941; it was at the southern edge of the Woyane rebellion of 1943. On 14 December 1895, Emperor Menilek's passed through Alamata on their way northwards against the Italians.

20th century 
Arbegnoch under British leadership, liberated the town from Italian control during the Second World War on 5 May 1941; it was at the southern edge of the Woyane rebellion of 1943.

The first reports of crop failure in Wollo, were made in October 1971 by the chief municipal officer of Alamata; this report was handled very indifferently by his superiors who did not respond until July 1972, when they asked for a revised report.

Alamata was garrisoned by the Derg during the Ethiopian Civil War. The Tigray People's Liberation Front captured the town in 1988.

Demographics 

Based on the 2007 national census, Alamata has a total population of 33,214, of whom 16,140 are men and 17,074 women. 82.35% of the population said they were Orthodox Christians, and 16.96% were Muslim.

The 1994 census reported this town had a total population of 26,179 of whom 12,094 were males and 14,085 were females.

Geography

Location 

Alamata is located in the southern zone of Tigray.

Topography 

Topographically, Alamata is divided into western highland and eastern lowland. It is characterized by steep slopes, gorges and undulating terrain having scattered flat lands used for grazing livestock and farming. It covers 25% of the woreda. The topography of the area dominated by steep slopes has induced erosion. The plain landscape of this area makes the area suitable for agriculture and it covers 75% of the woreda.

Alamata is located in the endoreic basin of the Afar Triangle. The streams near Alamata do not reach the ocean.

Economy

Agriculture 
A mixed farming system with the predominant of crop production is practiced in the district. The major food crops grown in the area are cereals (sorghum, teff, and maize), pulses, oilseeds, vegetables and root crops.

Electricity 

Transportation 
The Weldiya–Mekelle Railway will have a station in Alamata.

Notes 

Populated places in the Tigray Region